Hudsonville High School, is a public high school located in Hudsonville, Michigan. It serves grades 9-12 for the Hudsonville Public Schools.

It serves all of Hudsonville and small portions of Allendale and Jenison. It also includes the majority of Jamestown Charter Township and portions of the following townships: Blendon, Georgetown, and Zeeland, as well as a small portion of Allendale Charter Township.

Demographics

The demographic breakdown of the 1,378 students enrolled for the 2018–19 school year was: 
Male - 49.9%
Female - 50.1%
Native American/Alaskan - 0.2%
Asian - 1.9%
Black - 2.2%
Hispanic - 5.2%
White - 88.2%
Multiracial - 2.2%

18.2% of the students were eligible for free or reduced-cost lunch. For 2018–19, Hudsonville was a Title I school.

Athletics 
The Hudsonville Eagles competes in the Ottawa-Kent Conference. School colors are maize and blue. The following Michigan High School Athletic Association (MHSAA) sanctioned sports are offered:

Baseball (boys) 
Basketball (girls and boys) 
Bowling (girls and boys) 
Competitive cheerleading (girls)
Cross country (girls and boys) 
Football (boys)
Golf (girls and boys) 
Ice hockey (boys) 
Lacrosse (girls and boys) 
Soccer (girls and boys) 
Softball (girls)
Swim and dive (girls and boys) 
Tennis (girls and boys) 
Track (girls and boys) 
Volleyball (girls) 
Wrestling (boys)

Notable alumni

Ray Bentley, National Football League (NFL) linebacker and sportscaster 
 Kyle Clement, NFL defensive lineman
 Tyson DeVree, NFL tight end
 Joel Smeenge, NFL defensive lineman 
 John Vander Wal, Major League Baseball (MLB) journeyman utility player

References

External links
 Hudsonville High School

Public high schools in Michigan
Schools in Ottawa County, Michigan